Chalcosyrphus bettyae is a species of hoverfly in the family Syrphidae.

Distribution
Cuba.

References

Eristalinae
Insects described in 1981
Diptera of North America
Taxa named by F. Christian Thompson